Anton is a Belarusian, Bulgarian, Greek, Catalan, Croatian, Danish, Dutch, Estonian, Finnish, German, Macedonian, Norwegian, Romanian, Russian, Slovak, Slovene, Swedish, and Ukrainian given name, from Latin Antonius.

The name is used in Greenland, Suriname, Namibia, South Africa, Indonesia, Vietnam, Catalan Countries, Belgium, Netherlands, Germany, Eastern Switzerland, Austria, the Czech Republic, Poland, Slovenia, Croatia, Hungary, Slovakia, parts of Serbia, Romania, Bulgaria, North Macedonia, Moldova, Ukraine, Belarus, Lithuania, Latvia, Estonia, Israel, Russia, Mongolia, Kazakhstan, Georgia, Azerbaijan, Armenia, Kyrgyzstan, Uzbekistan, Turkmenistan, Albania and Tajikistan.

People 
Anton of Schauenburg (died 1558), Archbishop-Elector of Cologne
Anton I of Georgia, Catholicos–Patriarch of the Georgian Orthodox Church (1744–1755 and 1764–1788)
Anton II of Georgia (1762 or 1763–1827), King of Kartli and Kakheti, and Catholicos Patriarch of Georgia, canonized by the Georgian church in 2011
Anton I, Prince Esterházy (1738-1794), a prince of Hungary
Anton of Stolberg-Wernigerode (1785-1854), chief minister in Magdeburg, governor of the Prussian Province of Saxony and Prussian Minister of State
Prince Anton of Hohenzollern-Sigmaringen (1841-1866), German prince and soldier
Anton Adolf Kuyten (1937-2017), Dutch writer
Anton Anton (born 1949), Romanian engineer and politician
Anton Apriantono (born 1959), Indonesian politician
Anton I. Arion (1824-1897), Romanian politician
Anton Ažbe (1862–1905), Slovenian painter
Anton Babchuk (born 1984), Ukrainian-Russian ice hockey player
Anton Bacalbașa (1865-1899), Romanian political journalist
Anton Bakov (born 1965), Russian politician
Anton Barten, Belgian economist
Heinrich Anton de Bary (1831–1888), German surgeon and biologist
Anton du Beke (born 1966), English dancer
Anton Berindei (1838–1899), Romanian general and politician
Anton Bruckner (1824–1896), Austrian composer
Anton Bruehl (1900–1982), Australian-born American photographer
Anton Burger (1911–1991), Austrian-German Nazi SS concentration camp commandant
Anton Buttigieg (1912–1983), Maltese politician and poet, president of Malta from 1976 until 1981 
Anton Cermak (1873–1933) American politician
Anton Chekhov (1860–1904), Russian writer
Anton Corbijn (born 1955), Dutch photographer and video director
Anton Coșa (born 1961), Romanian Catholic bishop
Anton Davidoglu (1876-1958), Romanian mathematician
Anton Denikin (1872–1947), Russian military commander
Anton Dermota (1910–1989), Slovenian tenor
Anton Diabelli (1781–1858), Austrian composer
Anton Docher (1852-1928), priest and missionary
Anton Dostler (1891-1945), German general executed for war crimes
Anton Drexler (1884-1942), Founder of the Nazi Party
Anton Dubrov (born 1995), Belarusian tennis coach
Anton Durcovici (1888-1951), Romanian Catholic bishop
Anton Ewald (born 1993), Swedish singer and dancer
Anton Ferdinand (born 1985), English footballer
Anton Fokin (born 1982), Uzbek gymnast
Anton Fugger (1493–1560), German merchant
Anton Gavel (born 1984), German basketball player
Anton Geesink (1934–2010), Dutch judoka
Anton Glasnović (born 1981), Croatian sports shooter
Anton Golopenția (1909-1951), Romanian sociologist
Anton Jude Gomes (1960-2012), Sri Lankan actor and comedian
Anton Gubankov (1965-2016), Russian TV journalist and civil servant
Anton Gunn (born 1973), American politician
Anton Gustafsson (born 1990), Swedish ice hockey player
Anton Hansen Tammsaare (A. H. Tammsaare; 1878–1940), Estonian writer
Anton thor Helle (1683–1748), Baltic German clergyman and translator
Anton Hofreiter (born 1970), German politician
Anton Holban (1902-1937), Romanian novelist
Anton Hysén (born 1990), Swedish football player
Anton Irv (1886–1919), Estonian military commander
Anton Janša (1734–1773), Slovenian beekeeper and painter
Anton Jones (1937-2016), Sri Lankan singer
Anton Josipović (born 1961), Bosnian Croat boxer who competed for Yugoslavia
Anton Kaindl (1902–1948), German SS concentration camp commandant
Anton Karas (1906–1985), Austrian zither player
 Anton Kazarnovski (born 1985), Israeli-Russian basketball player 
Anton Khudobin (born 1986), Kazakhstani-Russian professional ice hockey goaltender
Anton Koolmann (1899–1953), Estonian wrestler
Anton Korošec (1872–1940), Slovenian politician
Anton Kržan (1835–1888), Croatian academic
Anton LaVey, founder of the Church of Satan
Anton Lesser, English actor
Anton Lipošćak (1863–1924), Austro-Hungarian general of Croatian descent
Anton Lundell (born 2001), Finnish ice hockey player
Anton Maresch (born 1991), Austrian basketball player
Anton Moisescu (1913-1997), Romanian politician
Anton Muttukumaru (1908-2001), first indigenous Commander of the Sri Lanka Army
Anton Nilson (1887–1989), Swedish Communist militant
Anton Tomaž Linhart (1756–1795), Slovenian playwright and historian
Anton Newcombe (born 1967), American musician
Apolo Anton Ohno, American speed skater
Anton Õunapuu (1887–1919), Estonian scouting activist
Anton Pann (1790s-1854), Ottoman-born Wallachian composer
Anton Peschka (1885–1940), Austrian painter
Anton Pettersson (1994-2015), perpetrator of the 2015 Trollhättan school attack
Anton Pieck (1895–1987), Dutch artist
Anton Ranjith Pillainayagam (born 1966), Sri Lankan Tamil Catholic priest, Auxiliary Bishop of the Archdiocese of Colombo
Anton Raadik (1917–1999), Estonian boxer
Anton Rabie, Canadian billionaire businessman
Anton Rodgers, English actor
Anton Rödin (born 1990), Swedish ice hockey player
Anton Rubinstein (1829–1894), Russian pianist, composer and conductor
Anton Santesson (born 1994), Swedish ice hockey defenceman
Anton Shipulin (born 1987), Russian biathlete
 Anton Shoutvin (born 1989), Israeli basketball player 
Anton Martin Slomšek (1800–1862), Slovenian bishop
Anton Heinrich Springer (1825–1891), German art historian and writer
Anton Storch (1892–1975), German politician
Anton Strålman, Swedish ice hockey player
Anton Sullivan (born 1991/1992), Offaly Gaelic footballer
Anton Tabakov (born 1960), Russian actor
Anton Thernes (1892–1944), German Nazi SS deputy commandant of concentration camp executed for war crimes
Anton Dayasritha Tissera (born 1966), Sri Lankan Sinhala politician
Anton Uesson (1879–1942), Estonian politician and engineer
Anton Vaino (born 1972), Russian diplomat and politician
Anton Volchenkov (born 1982), Russian ice hockey player
Anton Webern (1883–1945), Austrian composer
Anton Wilfer (1901–1976), Czechoslovak luthier
Anton Wright (born 1974), adventurer and entrepreneur
Anton Yelchin (1989–2016), Russian-American actor
Anton Yugov (1904–1991), Bulgarian politician
Anton Zaslavski also known as Zedd (born 1989), Russian-German music producer and DJ
Anton Zeilinger (born 1945), Austrian quantum physicist

Fictional characters
Anton, mythological son of Hercules created by Mark Antony, and from whom he claimed descent
Anton, aka Tony, former co-leader of the gang, the Jets, from West Side Story
Anton O'Neill, title role of feature film Anton, directed by Graham Cantwell
Anton, fictional geneticist, credited with discovering Anton's Key, in the Ender's Game series of books by Orson Scott Card
Anton Chigurh, antagonist in the Cormac McCarthy novel No Country for Old Men and the 2007 movie of the same title
Anton Phibes, murderous organist in two cult movies starring Vincent Price
Anton Steenwijk, protagonist in the Harry Mulisch novel The Assault
Anton Jackson, a homeless person portrayed by Damon Wayans in the American comedy sketch show In Living Color
Anton Ego, food critic in the 2007 Pixar film Ratatouille
Anton Gorodetsky, hero and narrator of most of the Watch novels by Sergei Lukyanenko
Anton Herzen, supposed vampire in Professor Layton and the Diabolical Box who lived in Herzen Castle
Anton Tobias, main character in the horror comedy film Idle Hands, played by actor Devon Sawa
Anton Shudder, side character in the Skulduggery Pleasant series. Owner of the Midnight Hotel.
Anton Hofmiller, main character in the book Beware of Pity, written by Stefan Zweig
Anton Vanko, name of two Marvel Comics characters: Crimson Dynamo and Whiplash
Anton Zeck, a master thief hired to steal Shredder's helmet in TMNT 2012.
Anton Krieg, a German black market kingpin in Wolfenstein 2009
Frederick Anton Reiker, male protagonist in the book Summer of My German Soldier by Bette Greene.
Anton, a character from The Amazing World of Gumball
Anton, Gilfoyle's server in Silicon Valley.
Antoine Roquentin, diarist/narrator of Jean-Paul Sartre's novel Nausea
Anton Lavrentievich G__v, narrator of Fyodor Dostoyevsky's novel Demons

See also 

Anthon (given name)
Antoan
Antona (name)
Antono (name)
Antoon
Antos (name)
Antoun
Antun
Antton (name)
Antxon, name

References

  http://www.behindthename.com/name/anton

Bulgarian masculine given names
Danish masculine given names
Estonian masculine given names
French masculine given names
German masculine given names
Dutch masculine given names
Scandinavian masculine given names
Serbian masculine given names
Slovene masculine given names
Croatian masculine given names
Macedonian masculine given names
Swedish masculine given names
Norwegian masculine given names
Romanian masculine given names
Russian masculine given names
Ukrainian masculine given names
Polish masculine given names
Czech masculine given names
Slovak masculine given names
Albanian masculine given names
Hungarian masculine given names